Zacharias Holmes (born September 11, 1991), also known as Zackass, is an American stunt performer and television personality. He is best known as the star and co-creator of MTV's Too Stupid to Die, and new Jackass member in Jackass Forever (2022).

Career 
Holmes started off his career by uploading stunt videos to YouTube. Some of these stunts included him electrocuting his lips with two stun guns, shooting a flare at his own crotch with a flare gun, and wearing a firecracker vest and igniting it. A few of his videos went viral, but after getting terminated from YouTube three times, he decided to upload his stunts to Instagram.

His videos started getting a lot of recognition again and he even did a few stunts with Jackass stars Steve-O and Bam Margera. After the CEOs of video production company Gunpowder & Sky, Jude Harris and Van Toffler, saw the stunts Holmes did, they wanted to make a TV show out of it, which led to the creation of Too Stupid to Die (2018), with former Jackass and CKY crew member Chris Raab serving as cinematographer.

After the show ended in 2018, Holmes continued uploading more stunts to his Instagram account, which got the attention of the Jackass stars, who then put him on Jackass Forever (2022). Since 2021, he hosts a web series called Fail News on Snapchat with Rachel Wolfson, who also was in Jackass Forever, and Chad Tepper, who was a co-star of Too Stupid to Die. Since 2022, Holmes hosts a podcast titled What The Fudge? along with Vinny Imperati.

Filmography

Television

Films

Web series

References

External links 
 
 
 Fail News on Snapchat

1991 births
American stunt performers
American television personalities
Male television personalities
Jackass (TV series)
Living people
People from Valparaiso, Indiana